Aligarh district is a district in the state of Uttar Pradesh, India. This district is a part of Aligarh Division. The districts which adjoin Aligarh are (clockwise from north) Gautam Buddha Nagar, Bulandshahr, Sambhal, Badaun, Kasganj, Hathras and Mathura.

Demographics

According to the 2011 census Aligarh district has a population of 36,73,889, roughly equal to the nation of Mauritania or the US state of Oklahoma. This gives it a ranking of 76th in India (out of a total of 640). Its population growth rate over the decade 2001-2011 was 22.78%. Aligarh has a sex ratio of 876 females for every 1000 males, and a literacy rate of 69.61%. Scheduled Castes make up 20.56% of the population.

The local language is Brajbhasha. At the time of the 2011 Census of India, 92.54% of the population in the district spoke Hindi, 5.34% Urdu and 1.90% Brajbhasha as their first language.

Tehsils
In 1941 to 1991 Census Aligarh District Includes the following tehsils   
 Aligarh                          
 Khair                         
 Atrauli                       
Hathras                        
Sikandra Rao
Iglas                          
Following Creation of Hathras District In 1997 Hathras , Sikandra Rao , Iglas . Later Iglas was again returned to Aligarh District. 
 Koil Aligarh
 Khair
 Atrauli
 Iglas
 Gabhana

Blocks
1. Block-Gonda
2. Block-Atrauli
3. Block-Tappal
4. Gangiri
5. Bijauli
6. Block-Dhanipur
7. Block-Iglas
8. Block-Jawan Sikandarpur
9. Block-Lodhaa
10. Block-Chandous
11. Block-Khair
12. अकराबाद, कोइल (अलीगढ़)
13. Block-Gabhana

Education in Aligarh 
Aligarh Muslim University is the centre of higher education in Aligarh. With around 30,000 students. The university offers more than 250 courses in both traditional and modern fields of education. In addition, there are many decent schools and colleges for primary and secondary level education.
 Raja Mahendra Pratap Singh State University, Aligarh
Mangalayatan University, (Private University)

Cities in Aligarh district
 Aligarh
 Khair
 Atrauli

Near by Districts
Hathras district
Mathura district
Bulandshahr district
Sambhal district
Gautam Buddha Nagar district (Noida)
Kasganj district
Budaun district
Palwal district

References

External links

 
Districts of Uttar Pradesh